Raina Fehl (August 23, 1920 – May 3, 2009) was an Austrian-born American classicist, writer and editor. She immigrated to the United States, 1939. United States citizen since 1944. U.S. Army Service 1945–1946, Psychiatric Social Worker, U.S. War Department, Research Analyst, Nuremberg War Crimes Trials, 1946–1947.  Married Philipp Fehl December 11, 1945. Mother of two daughters, Katharine, "Kathy Fehl", and Caroline "Lynn" Coulston. She died May 3, 2009, in Appleton, Wisconsin and buried near family at The Eternal Home Cemetery, Block 1540, Row A, Space 6, Colma California.

Her delightful smile, her beauty, her knowledge were extraordinary and memorable. She was admirable in so many ways, not the least of which was "the way she sacrificed so much of her own time and talent to further [her husband's] work, both while he was alive, and after his death; she was an absolute model of devotion. But of course her greatest quality was her own personality, her probity and honesty, and her capacity for loyal friendship."  Jennifer Montagu, chair, Gombrich Archive, Warburg Institute. Her joy in learning is epitomized in the story told by her colleague, Paul Olson, who fondly remembers her driving him to work with a Greek dictionary on the steering wheel. Paul Olson, Professor Emeritus Department of English, University of Nebraska. She and her work are discussed in the comic-philosophical novel Harmony Junction by Goddard Graves (2009, privately published).

Biography
Born August 23, 1920, Vienna, Austria.  Immigrated into the United States, 1939.  United States citizen since 1944.  U.S. Army Service 1945–1946, Psychiatric Social Worker, U.S. War Department, Research Analyst, Nuremberg War Crimes Trials, 1946–1947.  Married Philipp Fehl December 11, 1945.  Mother of two daughters, Katharine and Caroline.

Maria Raina Fehl was known as Raina (pronounced as if you were saying the Rhine River with a soft "a" on the end Rhine-a).  She was the daughter of the poet/author/civil rights attorney, Erich Fritz Schweinburg, 1890-1959 buried Rochester, Vermont, and the humanitarian, Rosa Gussman Schweinburg.  From her birth, she fought many physical battles, starting with contracting and surviving smallpox in the center where she was born.   She was restrained with tiny baby sized fetters and came away with only two tiny scars.  Although throughout her life, she suffered from difficult health problems, she never defined herself by her illnesses or any other of her life's hardships.  Instead, she lived her life with grace and energy and maintained that vitality to the very end of her life.

Education:
Wenzgasse Gymnasium, Vienna, Austria, Matura 1938
New Jersey College for Women, Rutgers, 1939–1942, B.A. (history and English)
Stanford University, 1947-1948 (German researching and writing on Karl Kraus)
University of Chicago 1948–1952 (German philosophy)
University of Nebraska, 1954–1962
University of North Carolina at Chapel Hill, 1962-1967 (classics)
University of Illinois, Urbana, M.A., 1976 (classics)

Career

Teaching
 Between 1947 and 1952, she was a German Instructor at the University of Chicago
 Between 1954 and 1962, English and Latin Instructor at the University of Nebraska, Lincoln, Nebraska
 Between 1965 and 1969, she was a German instructor again, this time at the North Carolina School of the Arts, Winston-Salem
 Visiting Appointments at Tel Aviv University, in winter, 1982; and at the Hebrew University, Jerusalem, in spring, 1992

Offices
International Survey of Jewish Monuments, vice-president, 1977–2000
Editor, The Cicognara Newsletter, published by the Leopoldo Cicognara Project at the University of Illinois Library, Vatican Library, Vatican City, 1992–2009
Director, The Leopoldo Cicognara Project at the University of Illinois Library, Vatican Library, Vatican City, dedicated to the study and promulgation of literary sources in the history of art, 2000–2009

Membership in learned societies
College of Art Association of America
International Survey of Jewish Monuments

Scholarly work
Franciscus Junius (the younger), The Literature of Classical Art
I.	The Painting of the Ancients, London, 1638.
II.	Catalogus Architectorum, Mechanicorum sed praecipue A critical edition and translation by Keith Aldrich, Philipp Fehl and Raina Fehl, University of California Press, Berkeley, California 192.
Catalogo ragionao dei libri d'arte e d'antichita posseduti dal Conte Cocognara (Vatican Press, 2001).  A critical edition of the 1821 imprint published in Pisa.  Co-editor with Philipp P. Fehl and Maria Raina Fehl.
III.	Editor, The Art of Mourning, Philipp P. Fehl. 
Collections
The Cicognara Library:  Literary Sources in the History of Art and Kindred Subjects (Leopoldo Cicognara Program at the University of Illinois Library in Association with the Vatican Library, Vatican City, 1989–2009.
Microfiche collection of ca 5,000 titles.  Co-editor with Philipp P. Fehl.
Books
Jewish Heritage Report, Vol.II, Nos. 1-2 / Spring-Summer 1998, Stein und Name, Review.
The literature of classical art / Franciscus Junius ; edited by Keith Aldrich, Philipp Fehl, Raina Fehl

Mikki
It seems Raina Fehl had a special affinity for mice.  When her daughters were young, she often helped them fall asleep by telling them stories of a pretty little lady mouse who wore white gloves and managed to keep them perfectly clean even when taking railroad trips.  Years later while working on the Cicognara Project at the Vatican Library, Raina Fehl began writing the Mikki Stories.  Originally written again for her children, these stories were supposedly the work of the scholar Michaela Mouse, affectionately known to her family as "Mikki", the Library Mouse. Raina Fehl portrayed herself as merely the translator of the English versions.  In time, Mikki's relatives became the authors of the continuing stories.  Much like the "translator", the mice work for the most part in the Salone Sistino in the Vatican Library.  In this excerpt from "The Library Mouse.  A Monologue
by Michaela Mouse, English version offered by M. Raina Fehl in honor of the birthday of Katharine Fehl", Mikki describes her wonderful place of work: 
"I mentioned the Salone Sistino before.  That is a beautiful room, indeed.  And many, many people come to see it when they go through the Vatican Museum.  It really belongs to the Library, as does that entire side or corridor of the museum, but for the visitors it's simply a part of the museum.  Most just look at the special exhibits in glass cases in the room.  But some do look up at the pilasters that show the inventors of the letters of the alphabet -- Christ is one of them, of the alpha and the omega.  Some also look at the big frescos on the walls showing famous libraries in antiquity, really famous stories that went on in them.  But there is something that hardly any of them notice.  The painters were very conscientious observers of reality and therefore you will find at least one mouse in every one of those scenes.  I love going up to look at the mouse peeking out between the books the librarians at Alexandria are putting in order.  They are very well portrayed.  In another there is a  mouse that sits on the back of the chair of the hero and looks with him at his manuscripts.  There may even be some mice I never discovered."
In many ways, the excerpt depicts how much Raina loved working at the Vatican.

Cicognara project
Together with her husband, Philipp Fehl, Raina Fehl worked in the Sala Cicognara in the Biblioteka Vaticana in the Vatican City. In October 2000 she became the Director of the Cicognara Project.

Unpublished modern fiction
After her death, Raina's daughters discovered an ordinary bound school notebook with the words "Don't Lose Me" written on the cover in her handwriting.  Inside they discovered short stories in Raina's handwriting.  Never before had anyone known that she wrote fiction as well as all her erudite works.  The fiction is being transcribed and will be published posthumously.

References

External links
 http://www.cicognara.com/
 http://www.rainafehl.com/
 http://www.philippfehl.com/
 http://catalogue.nla.gov.au/Record/251816
 http://www.journals.uchicago.edu/doi/abs/10.2307/2862949
 http://www.isjm.org/
 http://samgrubersjewishartmonuments.blogspot.com/2010/05/in-memory-yahrzeit-of-isjm-founder.html

1920 births
2009 deaths
Austrian emigrants to the United States
Austrian non-fiction writers
20th-century American educators
American art historians
Women art historians
Austrian Jews
American people of Austrian-Jewish descent
American people of Czech-Jewish descent
Writers from Vienna
Jewish American historians
American women historians
20th-century American women educators
20th-century American non-fiction writers
20th-century American women writers
20th-century American Jews
21st-century American Jews
21st-century American women